Thinker or The Thinker may refer to:

 The Thinker, a bronze sculpture by Auguste Rodin
 The Thinker: Portrait of Louis N. Kenton, a 1900 oil painting by Thomas Eakins
 Thinker (DC Comics), five fictional, telepathic supervillains
 The Thinker (horse) (1978–1991), an Irish–British racehorse
 Ulmus parvifolia 'The Thinker', a Chinese elm cultivar
 Karditsa Thinker, Neolithic clay figurine at the National Archaeological Museum of Athens

See also
 Mad Thinker, a robotics genius supervillain in the fictional Marvel Universe